Saqr III bin Sultan Al Qasimi (1924 – November 9, 1993) was the ruler of the Emirate of Sharjah, a Trucial State and now one of the United Arab Emirates, from May 1951 to 24 June 1965.

Saqr was the eldest son of Sultan bin Saqr Al Qasimi II, who ruled 1924–51. After Sultan's death, Saqr became the ruler. Saqr was an Arab nationalist, which undermined the British Empire's control of the Trucial States. In 1964, he supported the opening of an Arab League office in Sharjah, after a visit by an Arab League delegation led by Abdul Khalek Hassouna, the Secretary-General at the time. The British viewed this move as a threat, which lead the British administration to intervene and initiate the ouster of Saqr as the ruler Sharjah. In 1965, Glencairn Paul, the British Political Agent in Dubai, was tasked to inform Saqr of his deposition. Saqr was then exiled to Bahrain and eventually Cairo. His cousin, Khalid bin Mohammed Al Qasimi succeeded him.

On 24 January 1972, following soon after the creation of the United Arab Emirates on 2 December 1971, Saqr returned to Sharjah from Egypt with a number of mercenaries and seized power in an attempted coup. The group infested the Ruler's palace at approximately 2.30pm, with reports of gunfire and grenade explosions within the palace. Besieged by the Union Defence Force, which arrived an hour later, Saqr finally gave himself up in the early hours of 25 January to UAE Minister of Defence, Sheikh Mohammed bin Rashid Al Maktoum. However, Khalid was killed in the action and Saqr's brother Ahmed was offered the position of UAE justice minister.

References

Sheikhs of the Emirate of Sharjah
House of Al Qasimi
1924 births
1993 deaths
20th-century Arabs